Victor Klemperer (9 October 188111 February 1960) was a German scholar who also became known as a diarist. His journals, published in Germany in 1995, detailed his life under the German Empire, the Weimar Republic, the Third Reich, and the German Democratic Republic. Those covering the period of the Third Reich have since become standard sources and have been extensively quoted by Saul Friedländer, Michael Burleigh, Richard J. Evans, and Max Hastings.

Early life
Klemperer was born in Landsberg an der Warthe (now Gorzów Wielkopolski, Poland) to a Jewish family. His parents were Dr. Wilhelm Klemperer, a rabbi, and Henriette née Frankel. Victor had three brothers and four sisters:
 Georg, 1865–1946, physician, director of the hospital Berlin-Moabit (who treated Vladimir Lenin)
 Felix, 1866–1932, physician, director of the hospital Berlin-Reinickendorf
 Margarete (Grete), 1867–1942, married Riesenfeld
 Hedwig, 1870–1893, married Machol
 Berthold, 1871–1931, lawyer
 Marta, 1873–1954, married Jelski
 Valeska (Wally), 1877–1936, married Sussmann
Victor was a cousin to the conductor Otto Klemperer, and first cousin once removed to Otto's son, the actor Werner Klemperer. In 1903 Klemperer converted to Protestantism for the first time, shortly thereafter returning to Judaism.

Victor Klemperer attended several gymnasia. He was a student of philosophy, Romance and German studies at universities in Munich, Geneva, Paris and Berlin from 1902 to 1905, and later worked as a journalist and writer in Berlin, until he resumed his studies in Munich from 1912.

Though not a religious man, Victor Klemperer needed a religious identity, as Jew, Christian or dissident, to support his academic career. He chose Christianity as being most compatible with his much stronger conviction of being German, and became baptised again in Berlin in 1912.

He completed his doctorate (on Montesquieu) in 1913 and was habilitated under the supervision of Karl Vossler in 1914. From 1914 to 1915, Klemperer lectured at the University of Naples, after which he became a decorated military volunteer in World War I. From 1920 he was Professor of Romance Languages at the Technical University of Dresden.

Third Reich
Despite his conversion to Protestantism in 1912 and his strong identification with German culture, Klemperer's life started to worsen considerably after the Nazis' seizure of power in 1933. Under the 1933 Nazi "First Racial Definition", a person was defined as a Mischling if they had one Jewish parent or grandparent, regardless of religious belief.

Klemperer's diary, which he kept up throughout the Nazi era, provides an exceptional account of day-to-day life under the tyranny of the Third Reich. Two of the three volumes of his diaries that have been published in English translations, I Will Bear Witness and To the Bitter End, concern this period. This diary also details the Nazis' perversion of the German language for propaganda purposes in entries that Klemperer used as the basis for his postwar book LTI – Lingua Tertii Imperii.

Klemperer's diary chiefly chronicles the restricted daily life of Jews during the Nazi terror, including the onset of a succession of prohibitions concerning many aspects of everyday existence, such as finances, transportation, medical care, the maintenance and use of household help, food and diet, and the possession of appliances, newspapers, and other items. He also gives accounts of suicides, household searches, and the deportation of his friends, mostly to Theresienstadt. Throughout his experience, Klemperer maintained his sense of identity as a German, expressing even in 1942 that "I am German, and still waiting for the Germans to come back; they have gone to ground somewhere". Although this is one of the phrases most evocative of Klemperer's despair over the corruption of German culture, his sense of who and what was truly "German" evolved considerably during the war. Especially in the final weeks of the war and immediately after Germany's surrender, when Klemperer was free to mix and talk with (or eavesdrop on) a wide variety of Germans, his observations of the "German" identity show how complex this question was, and why it was so central to his purpose in writing the LTI and his journals.

In 1933, the Law for the Restoration of the Professional Civil Service was passed removing all non-Aryan professors from their profession, with the exception of those who had fought in World War I. This exception allowed Klemperer to continue in his position a little longer, although without the right to use the University library or other faculty privileges. However Klemperer was gradually forced out of his job and forced to retire. Although he was allowed to keep part of his pension, the money quickly ran out and he and his wife had to take cleaning jobs (this is unsubstantiated in his diaries). 

Victor Klemperer's wife was not Jewish. She was an "Aryan" German, and her marriage to Klemperer allowed him to survive this period, as many intermarried Jews were able to. The Nazi Government could not effectively force people to divorce, so many intermarried Jewish and non-Jewish Germans stayed married, despite scrutiny by others. Intermarriage helped Victor Klemperer to survive, but brought down his wife's societal status.

The couple lost their right to drive and had to sell their car, and their housekeeper had to resign due to the law against Jews employing Aryan women. Eventually the Klemperers were forced to put down their household cat, a tomcat named Muschel, because of a restriction as to Jews' ownership of pets. A Nazi law obliged every Jewish female or male to add Sarah or Israel, respectively, as a middle name on all official documents, allowing Jews to be identified as such whenever required to give their full name. (Klemperer dropped the "Israel" as soon as he could safely do so.) His wife, not Jewish, did not have to do this.

That same year, and subsequently, Klemperer was so dismayed with the spread of antisemitism, even among those who professed to be against the Nazis, that he from time to time entertained the possibility of fleeing to the US. A later diary entry—for April 10, 1940—records other problems with emigration: "Meeting with the emigration adviser of the Jewish Community, result less than zero: You really must get out—we see no possibility. American-Jewish committees support only observant Jews." But in the end his connection to his fatherland was too strong, even after Kristallnacht in November 1938, and the outbreak of war. During the pogrom later in November 1938 their house was searched by Nazis who found Klemperer's saber from World War I—he was arrested briefly and released. By this time he had come to concede that "No one can take my Germanness away from me, but my nationalism and patriotism are gone forever." This release can be attached to the fact that he had a German wife. Although the day after his arrest he wrote to his brother Georg asking for assistance in leaving Germany, in the end he did not do so.

Since his wife, Eva, was "Aryan", Klemperer avoided deportation, often narrowly, but in 1940, he and his wife were rehoused under miserable conditions in a "Jews' House"  (Judenhaus) with other "mixed couples". Here, and especially when he ventured out, or at factories where he was forced to work, he was routinely questioned, mistreated, and humiliated by the Gestapo, Hitler Youth members and Dresden citizens.  Only because of his "Aryan" German wife were the couple able to procure food enough to subsist. In the diary, the much-feared Gestapo is seen carrying out daily, humiliating, and brutal house searches, delivering beatings, hurling insults, and robbing inhabitants of coveted foodstuffs and other household items. In addition, the diary relates the profound uncertainty all Germans—Jews and non-Jews—experienced because of the paucity of reliable information about the war's progress, largely due to the propaganda so central to the Reich's conduct of the war and of the Final Solution. Klemperer and his fellow Jews became aware only gradually of the nature of atrocities and scale of "extermination" at camps such as Theresienstadt and Auschwitz, even as they watched friends and neighbors deported and their risk of deportation mounted.

Flight
On 13 February 1945, Klemperer witnessed the delivery of notices of deportation to some of the last remaining members of the Jewish community in Dresden, and feared that the authorities would soon also send him to his death. On the following three nights the Allies heavily bombed Dresden for the first time, causing massive damage and a firestorm; during the chaos that followed, Klemperer removed his yellow star (punishable by death if discovered) on 19 February, joined a refugee column, and escaped into American-controlled territory. He and his wife survived, and Klemperer's diary narrates their return, largely on foot through Bavaria and Eastern Germany, to their house in Dölzschen, on the outskirts of Dresden. They managed to reclaim the house, which the Nazis had "aryanised".

Post-war
After the war, Klemperer joined the communist Socialist Unity Party of Germany, and was reinstated in a university post at Leipzig University. His former friend, historian , who had severed connections with Klemperer upon his dismissal from the University of Dresden, welcomed him back as if nothing had happened.

He became a significant cultural figure in East Germany, lecturing at the universities of Greifswald, Berlin and Halle. He was a delegate of the Cultural Association of the GDR in the GDR's Parliament (Volkskammer) from 1950 to 1958, and frequently mentions in his later diary his frustration at its lack of power and its largely ceremonial role.

Klemperer's diary was published in 1995 as Tagebücher (Berlin, Aufbau). It was an immediate literary sensation and rapidly became a bestseller in Germany. An English translation of the years spanning the Nazi seizure of power through Klemperer's death has appeared in three volumes: I Will Bear Witness (1933 to 1941), To The Bitter End (1942 to 1945) and The Lesser Evil (1945 to 1959).

He also published The Language of the Third Reich, a study on the language of Nazi propaganda.

In 1995, Victor Klemperer was posthumously awarded the Geschwister-Scholl-Preis for his work, Ich will Zeugnis ablegen bis zum letzten. Tagebücher 1933–1945.

Documentary
In 2000, Herbert Gantschacher wrote, together with Katharina and Jürgen Rostock, the documentary play Chronicle 1933–1945 using original documents from the biographies of Robert Ley and Victor Klemperer. The first performance took place in 2000 in the documentation centre at the planned "Strength Through Joy" beach resort Prora on the island of Rügen in Germany.

In 2003, Stan Neumann directed a documentary based on Klemperer's diaries, La langue ne ment pas (Language does not lie), which considers the importance of Klemperer's observations and the role of the witness in extreme situations.

See also
 List of Holocaust diarists
 List of diarists
 Union of Persecutees of the Nazi Regime

References

Notes

Bibliography
 Bartov, Omer, "The Last German", in The New Republic, 1998-12-28, pp. 34+
scholarly overview of Klemperer's diaries by a professor at Brown University
Klemperer, Victor, I Shall Bear Witness: The Diaries of Victor Klemperer, 1933–41, translated by Martin Chalmers, London: Weidenfeld & Nicolson, 1998 
Klemperer, Victor, To the Bitter End: The Diaries of Victor Klemperer, 1942–1945, translated by Martin Chalmers, London: Weidenfeld & Nicolson, 1999
Klemperer, Victor, The Lesser Evil: The Diaries of Victor Klemperer, 1945–1959, translated by Martin Chalmers, London: Weidenfeld & Nicolson, 2003 
 "Victor Klemperer, Early life" at the Aufbau-Verlag website  
 "Victor Klemperer Kolleg, Berlin"

External links

 
 Spiegel International: Victor Klemperer
 Spiegel International: The Dresden diaries
 Excerpts from Klemperer's diaries
 Ms Susie Ehrmann. The Diaries of Victor Klemperer
 The everyday life of tyranny

1881 births
1960 deaths
People from Gorzów Wielkopolski
People from the Province of Brandenburg
19th-century German Jews
Jewish philosophers
German Protestants
Converts to Protestantism from Judaism
Communist Party of Germany politicians
Socialist Unity Party of Germany politicians
Members of the 1st Volkskammer
Members of the 2nd Volkskammer
Cultural Association of the GDR members
Union of Persecutees of the Nazi Regime members
German diarists
German philologists
German literary theorists
Propaganda theorists
German male non-fiction writers
Französisches Gymnasium Berlin alumni
Academic staff of the University of Greifswald
Academic staff of the Martin Luther University of Halle-Wittenberg
Academic staff of the Humboldt University of Berlin
German Army personnel of World War I
Holocaust survivors
Recipients of the National Prize of East Germany
Recipients of the Patriotic Order of Merit in silver
Members of the German Academy of Sciences at Berlin
Holocaust diarists
19th-century Prussian people
Academic staff of Leipzig University
20th-century philologists